Igor Zidić (born 10 February 1939) is a Croatian art historian, art critic, poet and essayist. He is considered a top expert on Croatian modern art.

Zidić was born in Split, where he graduated from the Classical Gymnasium. He obtained a diploma in art history and comparative literature from the University of Zagreb in 1964. Zidić became the editor of Hrvatski tjednik in 1971, but lost his job after the magazine was shut down by the Yugoslavian government.

Zidić was a director of Modern Gallery in Zagreb from 1989 to 2008. From 2002–14, he was the president of Matica hrvatska. In 1986, Zidić received the Tin Ujević Award for poetry.

Zidić is a father of six children.

References

Sources

1939 births
Living people
Writers from Split, Croatia
Faculty of Humanities and Social Sciences, University of Zagreb alumni
Croatian art historians
Croatian art critics
Croatian essayists
Male essayists
20th-century Croatian poets
20th-century Croatian historians
Directors of museums in Croatia
Croatian male poets
20th-century essayists
20th-century male writers
21st-century Croatian historians